The Kollegienkirche (Collegiate Church) in Salzburg, Austria, is the church of the University of Salzburg. It was built in Baroque style by Johann Bernhard Fischer von Erlach. Dedicated to the Immaculate Conception, it is part of the UNESCO World Heritage Site Historic Centre of Salzburg. It is now both the parish church of people connected to the university and a venue of the Salzburg Festival.

History 
The building is the church of the University of Salzburg, located at the Universitätsplatz (University square). Bishop  planned a university church on the location of the former Frauengarten, instead of using the Aula (main auditorium) for church services of the university. While two successors were not able to realise the plan, Johann Ernst von Thun succeeded as part of his plan to develop Salzburg in Baroque style. The building by Johann Bernhard Fischer von Erlach was begun in 1694. In 1707, it was dedicated to the Immaculate Conception, which is celebrated on 8 December, a national holiday in Austria. It is believed that Mozart's Missa brevis in D Minor, K. 65, was commissioned by the church and premiered on 4 February 1769.

During the occupation by Napoleon, the church was used as storage. After the university was dissolved, it served as a garrison church. In 1922, the Salzburg Festival performed there the premiere of Hugo von Hofmannsthal's Das Salzburger große Welttheater, directed by Max Reinhardt. In 1969, Emilio de' Cavalieri's Rappresentatione di Anima, et di Corpo was presented in an arrangement by Bernhard Paumgartner. The church has been a regular venue of the festival since the 1970s. In 2008, Salvatore Sciarrino's opera Luci mie traditrici was staged by Rebecca Horn.

The church was returned to its original status as a university church in 1964. On 18 May 2008, it was designated the parish church for a parish named Universitätspfarrsprengel, serving people connected to the university. The building has been restored in the 21st century, beginning with the apse, which was completed in 2010. Most of the other restoration was completed in 2013.

The church is a listed monument and part of the UNESCO World Heritage Site .

Architecture 
The church is a main work of Fischer von Erlach. He designed a hall with white walls without paintings which became a model for late-baroque churches in southern Germany.

Anton Bruckner played the organ several times. The organ was restored in 1982 by Orgelbau Pirchner.

Literature 
 Alice Schulte: Die Kollegienkirche in Salzburg. Eine impressionistische Studie. In: Mitteilungen der Gesellschaft für Salzburger Landeskunde 57, Salzburg 1917, p. 1–12.
 Felicitas Hagen-Dempf: Die Kollegienkirche in Salzburg. Wien 1949.

Gallery

References

External links 

 
 Katholische Hochschulgemeinde Salzburg

University of Salzburg
Kollegienkirche
Baroque church buildings in Austria
Churches completed in 1707